Coleophora agridensis is a moth of the family Coleophoridae. It is found in Turkey.

References

External links

agridensis
Endemic fauna of Turkey
Moths described in 2001
Moths of Asia